Ramón Ruiz Alonso (1903–1982) was a Spanish politician who was a right-wing activist during the Second Spanish Republic and typographer by trade.  Married to actress Magdalena Penella, they had four daughters: Terele Pávez (1939–2017), Julia Ruiz Penella (1937–2017), Elisa Montés (b. 1934) and Emma Penella (1931–2007). He led the arrest and subsequent murder of the famous Spanish poet Federico García Lorca, on the 19th of August 1936.

1903 births
1982 deaths
People from the Province of Salamanca
Popular Action (Spain) politicians
CEDA politicians
Spanish people of the Spanish Civil War (National faction)
Members of the Congress of Deputies of the Second Spanish Republic